Aiden Thomas is a Latino-American author of young adult novels, best known for the book Cemetery Boys which was a New York Times bestseller and won numerous awards, including best of the year recognition from the American Library Association, Publishers Weekly, Barnes and Noble, NPR and School Library Journal.

Thomas is transgender and uses the he and they pronouns. They advocate for diverse representation in media.

Personal life 
Thomas was born in Oakland, California, and received a MFA in creative writing from Mills College. They live in Portland.

Books

Cemetery Boys 

Cemetery Boys was published on September 1, 2020, by Swoon Reads and tells the story of Yadriel, who is queer, transgender, Latino and a brujo. Unfortunately, his family does not recognize him as a man, which has serious effects on his abilities.

The book was named a best seller by the New York Times and IndieBound, and received starred reviews from Publishers Weekly and Booklist.

Cemetery Boys has received the following accolades:

 Bram Stoker Award for Best Young Adult Novel nominee (2020)
 Goodreads Choice Award Nominee for Young Adult Fantasy & Science Fiction (2020)
 Goodreads Choice Award Nominee for Debut Novel (2020)
 Locus Award for Best First Novel nominee (2021)
 Lodestar Award finalist (2021)
 American Library Association (ALA) Top Ten Best Fiction (2021)
 ALA Top Ten Amazing Audiobooks for Young Adults (2021)
 ALA Teens' Top Ten (2021)
 Publishers Weekly Best Books of the Year (2020)
 Barnes and Noble Best New Books of the Year (2020)
 National Book Award longlist (2020)
 NPR Best Books of the Year (2020)
 School Library Journal's (SLJ)Top 10 Audiobooks of 2020
 School Library Best Books of the Year
 Book Riot's Most Anticipated Books of 2020
 Tor.com's 25 Most Anticipated Science Fiction & Fantasy Books of 2020
 Goodreads'''s 38 Most Anticipated YA Novels of 2020
 Paste's Most Anticipated Young Adult Novels of 2020
 Bitch Media's 25 YA Novels Feminists Should Read in 2020

 Lost in the Never Woods Lost in the Never Woods was published on March 23, 2021, by Swoon Reads and is a retelling of Peter Pan. The book, as well as the audiobook, received a starred review from Booklist.

 The Sunbearer Trials 
In November 2021, Thomas announced the release of their next book, The Sunbearer Trials, a Mexican-inspired fantasy. The book was published on September 6, 2022 by Feiwel & Friends.

 Just Max 
In October 2021, Thomas announced the acquisition of Just Max'', a contemporary YA novel about a trans boy going to college and navigating all the new experiences that includes. Release is set for Winter 2024.

References

External links 
 Aiden Thomas official website

American writers of young adult literature
Writers from Oakland, California
Queer writers
LGBT Hispanic and Latino American people
Year of birth missing (living people)
Living people
21st-century American LGBT people
American LGBT novelists
Transgender novelists
American transgender writers